Crimora lutea is a species of sea slug, a nudibranch, a shell-less marine gastropod mollusc in the family Polyceridae.

Distribution 
This species was described from Japan. It has subsequently been reported from Western Australia, New South Wales and Tasmania, Australia  and Hawaii.

References

Polyceridae
Gastropods described in 1949